Stilboma viridis is a species of beetle in the genus Stilboma.

References

Lebiinae